is a 1947 Japanese film co-written and directed by Akira Kurosawa. It was made during the allied occupation of Japan and shows some of the challenges of life in early post-war Tokyo. The film is notable in the Kurosawa canon as the director's only shomin-geki, and because of a fourth wall-breaking scene at the climax. It is in black-and-white and runs 108 minutes.

Plot
Yuzo and his fiancée, Masako, meet in Tokyo on a Sunday for their weekly date. They are determined to have a nice day even though they only have thirty-five yen between them, but this is easier said than done: they hear about an apartment they hope to rent so they can live together, but find it is too expensive. Yuzo plays baseball with a group of children but accidentally damages a manjū shop. They visit a club owned by someone Yuzo knew in the army, but cannot get in because the manager refuses to believe that someone dressed as shabbily as Yuzo could really know the owner. They go to the zoo, but it starts to rain and they have no umbrella, so they try to see a performance of Schubert's Unfinished Symphony only to find that ticket scalpers have already bought up all the cheap tickets to sell at a markup.

The unlucky lovers go back to the apartment Yuzo is sharing with a friend (who will be away until the evening), but Masako leaves after Yuzo angrily tries to force himself on her; forgetting her purse, they reconcile when she comes back for it. The rain stops, and they go to a café, where they are charged for two café au lait, which are twice as expensive as the coffee they thought they had ordered. Yuzo gives his coat to the restaurant as collateral, promising to pay back the rest of the bill when he can afford it. Yuzo's spirits begin to lift as he and Masako talk about their dream of opening a "café for the masses" with good food and drinks at reasonable prices; they even act out running their shop in an empty lot they pass by. Yuzo then takes Masako to an empty outdoor amphitheater, where he pantomimes conducting a performance of the Unfinished Symphony they were not able to see earlier in the day. After this, they part ways until the following Sunday.

Cast
 Chieko Nakakita as Masako
 Isao Numasaki as Yuzo
 Atsushi Watanabe as Yamamoto 
 Zeko Nakamura as the dessert shop owner 
 Ichiro Sugai as Yamiya, the black-marketeer
 Masao Shimizu as the dance hall manager
 Midori Ariyama as Sono, Yamiya's mistress
 Sachio Sakai as the ticket seller

Production
One Wonderful Sunday is seen as a variation on the shomin-geki genre. On the film's climatic fourth wall-breaking scene, where the character Masako turns to the camera with moist eyes and earnestly asks the audience to applaud so that Yuzo and her can hear the music they are imagining, Akira Kurosawa said he wanted to "transform the audience into actual participants in the plot". Although Japanese audiences sat motionless during the scene, creating an "awkward empty space" where Kurosawa intended engagement, the director later happily remarked that audiences in Paris applauded with enthusiasm.

Reissues
The Criterion Collection has released One Wonderful Sunday on DVD in North America as part of two Kurosawa-centered box sets; 2008's Postwar Kurosawa, the seventh entry in their Eclipse series, and 2009's AK 100: 25 Films by Akira Kurosawa.

Reception
Rita Kempley of The Washington Post called One Wonderful Sunday "stylistically excessive, [and] wildly experimental", but wrote it does presage the genius of Kurosawa's later works, "with low tracking shots, characteristically close crops and obstructive scenery making their debut. It's like looking for footprints, tracking the master this apprentice was to become." David A. Conrad found One Wonderful Sunday to be one of many occupation-era Japanese films that parallel the more famous Italian neorealism movement, emphasizing poverty, hunger, weakening social mores, and urban dilapidation in the years after World War II.

Awards
 Mainichi Film Concours – "Best Director" and "Best Screenplay", 1948.

References

External links

One Wonderful Sunday at Allmovie
One Wonderful Sunday at Rotten Tomatoes
One Wonderful Sunday  at the Japanese Movie Database

1947 films
Films directed by Akira Kurosawa
1940s Japanese-language films
1947 romantic drama films
Japanese black-and-white films
Toho films
Films with screenplays by Akira Kurosawa
Films produced by Sōjirō Motoki
Japanese romantic drama films
Films set in Tokyo